Rene Kirby (born February 27, 1955) is an American film and television actor. He is perhaps best known for his performance in the Farrelly Brothers' film Shallow Hal.  In this film he plays the role of Walt, a man who, like Kirby himself, was born with spina bifida.

Film and television appearances
Shallow Hal (2001) - Walt
Stuck on You (2003) - Phil Rupp
Carnivàle Episode titled 'The Road to Damascus' (2005) - Hoppy

External links

1955 births
American male film actors
American male television actors
Living people
People with spina bifida
People from Burlington, Vermont
Male actors from Vermont